The Pacific Grand Prix was a round of the Formula One World Championship twice in the mid-1990s and non-championship events in the 1960s. The non-championship events were held at Laguna Seca from 1960 through 1963. The two championship races were held at the Tanaka International Aida circuit (now Okayama International Circuit), a slow and twisty  track in the countryside of Aida, Japan.

Championship races

The inaugural Championship race in 1994 saw Michael Schumacher take an easy victory after Ayrton Senna was involved in a first corner accident with Mika Häkkinen and Nicola Larini.  Schumacher overtook Senna into the first corner and was never threatened for the lead from that point onward. Schumacher could have lapped second placed Gerhard Berger in the last third of the race, but chose not to. The fastest lap was set on lap 3. The race was notable for the Jordan team and Rubens Barrichello's first podium finishes in F1 with third place.  The more recent Pacific Grand Prix in 1995 was a more eventful affair, with some close racing throughout the field.  Following the 1995 Kobe earthquake, the Pacific Grand Prix was moved from early in the calendar to the end of the calendar. The race culminated in a tactical victory for Michael Schumacher, securing his second World Championship, and making him the youngest double World Champion at the time (later surpassed by Fernando Alonso and Sebastian Vettel).

This race made Japan one of only nine countries (the others being Great Britain, Spain, Germany, Italy, France, the United States, and, as a result of emergency schedule realignment for the  season due to COVID-19 pandemic, Austria and Bahrain) to host multiple Grands Prix in the same year. A proposed attempt to continue the event's name with a race in Sentul International Circuit in Indonesia was considered for 1996 (with date scheduled for 13 October), but it was cancelled as the corners were deemed too tight and unsuitable for Formula 1.

With the announcement that the Japanese Grand Prix would switch from the Suzuka Circuit to the Fuji Speedway from 2007, there had been media speculation that Suzuka may retain a race under a resurrection of the Pacific Grand Prix title. However, it was later announced that the Japanese Grand Prix would alternate between Fuji and Suzuka from 2009 onward although the alternation was cancelled as Toyota, the current Fuji Speedway owner discontinued further F1 races at Fuji, having pulled out of F1 at the end of 2009.

Winners of the Pacific Grand Prix

Repeat winners (drivers)
A pink background indicates an event which was not part of the Formula One World Championship.

Repeat winners (constructors) 
A pink background indicates an event which was not part of the Formula One World Championship.

Repeat winners (engine manufacturers) 
A pink background indicates an event which was not part of the Formula One World Championship.

* Built by Cosworth

By year

A pink background indicates an event which was not part of the Formula One World Championship.

References

 
Formula One Grands Prix
Recurring sporting events established in 1960
Recurring sporting events disestablished in 1995